3-Succinoylsemialdehyde-pyridine dehydrogenase is an enzyme with systematic name 4-oxo-4-(pyridin-3-yl)butanal:NADP+ oxidoreductase. This enzyme catalyses the following chemical reaction

 4-oxo-4-(pyridin-3-yl)butanal + NADP+ + H2O  4-oxo-4-(pyridin-3-yl)butanoate + NADPH + H+

The enzyme has been characterized from the soil bacterium Pseudomonas sp. HZN6.

References

External links 
 

EC 1.2.1